The 1972 New Zealand Open, also known as Benson and Hedges Open for sponsorship reasons, was a combined men's and women's professional tennis tournament held at the Stanley Street Courts in Auckland, New Zealand. It was an independent event, i.e. not part of the 1972 Grand Prix or 1972 World Championship Tennis circuit. The tournament was played on outdoor grass courts and was held from 7 December through 12 December 1971. Ray Ruffels and Kerry Melville won the singles titles.

Finals

Men's singles
 Ray Ruffels defeated  John Alexander 6–4, 6–4, 7–6

Women's singles
 Kerry Melville defeated  Rosie Casals 6–4, 6–0

Men's doubles
 Ray Ruffels /  Bob Carmichael

Women's doubles
 Rosie Casals /  Billie Jean King defeated  Judy Dalton /  Françoise Dürr 7–6, 4–6, 7–5

References

External links
 ATP – tournament profile

Heineken Open
ATP Auckland Open
December 1972 sports events in New Zealand
New